The 2019–20 BYU Cougars men's basketball team represented Brigham Young University in the 2019–20 NCAA Division I men's basketball season. It was head coach Mark Pope's first season as BYU's head coach and the Cougars ninth season as members of the West Coast Conference (WCC). The Cougars played their home games at the Marriott Center in Provo, Utah. They finished the season 24–8, 13–3 in WCC play to finish in second place. They lost in the semifinals of the WCC tournament to Saint Mary's. Despite being a virtual lock to receive an at-large bid to the NCAA tournament, all postseason play was cancelled amid the COVID-19 pandemic.

Previous season 
The Cougars finished the 2018–19 season 19–13, 11–5 in West Coast Conference play to finish tied for second place with Saint Mary's. As the No. 3 seed in the WCC Tournament, they lost to San Diego in the quarterfinals. They were not invited to play in the NCAA or NIT tournament and declined to participate in any other postseason tournament. Shortly after the season ended, longtime head coach Dave Rose announced his retirement. Utah Valley head coach Mark Pope, who previously spent four seasons as an assistant at BYU under Rose, was hired in April to be his replacement. Later in April, Pope announced that he had selected Chris Burgess and Cody Fueger from Utah Valley and Nick Robinson from Southern Utah as his assistant coaches. Average home game attendance for the 16 games played at the Marriott Center for the 2018-19 season was 11,958. This was the second highest attendance in the West behind Arizona and ranked 27th nationwide.

Offseason

Departures 
During the 2018-19 season, BYU had two seniors that finished their eligibility to play college basketball - McKay Cannon and Luke Worthington. Two years passed since BYU had seniors as part of a basketball team. McKay Cannon transferred to BYU from Weber State University. Despite being a walk-on, Cannon started 18 games during his time at BYU. Luke Worthington played in 130 games (starting 62) and was the only player on the roster with NCAA tournament experience. Worthington will continue with the BYU basketball team as a graduate assistant alongside former teammate Nate Austin.

Nick Emery announced his retirement from college basketball via social media in July 2019 saying, "My time here has been rocky at times, but the good times definitely outweighed the bad...I am at a point in life where I am happy with what I've accomplished with basketball and I'm ready to start the next chapter of my life with my wife and son." Emery left BYU with one year of eligibility remaining.

In May 2019, Jahshire Hardnett committed to the University of Montana as a graduate transfer. However, due to graduate school admission timing issues, he reopened his recruitment in July 2019. A month later in August, Hardnett decided to transfer to the University of Missouri-Kansas City and will be eligible to play immediately. Rylan Bergersen transferred to the University of Central Arkansas, a Division I program, with two years of eligibility remaining. Bergersen was granted a waiver and was eligible to play immediately. Colby Leifson entered the transfer portal in October 2019, and as of the start of the season, no information was available regarding where he would transfer. On February 5, 2020, Utah Valley University announced Leifson would transfer to UVU with 3 seasons of eligibility remaining.

Incoming Transfers 
With Mark Pope coming as the new head coach to BYU from Utah Valley University (UVU), three players from the UVU basketball team decided to follow Pope and transfer to BYU. First, on April 23, it was announced that Jake Toolson, the 2018-19 Western Athletic Conference (WAC) Player of the Year who had previously played for BYU for two seasons, would transfer back to BYU. During Toolson's second season at BYU, he applied for a medical leave of absence in December 2015. Therefore, while Toolson played two additional seasons at UVU, he still had one year of eligibility remaining, and as a graduate transfer, was eligible to play immediately during the 2019-20 season. Before Toolson recommitted to BYU, he was recruited by several schools including Duke, Virginia, Arizona State and Utah State. Jeff Goodman of WatchStadium.com ranked Toolson as one of the top 10 graduate transfers during the offseason. Then on April 24, Wyatt Lowell, a consensus 3-star prospect, announced he would transfer from UVU. Lowell, who was the 2018-19 WAC Newcomer of the Year, will sit out the 2019-20 season and will have three years of eligibility remaining. The next month, on May 8, Richard Harward also announced he would be transferring from UVU to BYU with two years of eligibility remaining. As of the start of the season, it had not yet been determined whether Harward would be eligible to play during the 2019-20 season. However, in December, Mark Pope indicated that Harward did not receive a waiver and would not be eligible to play during the 2019-20 season.

On May 6, Blaze Nield announced via social media that he would transfer from Utah State Eastern with three years of eligibility remaining. While he had scholarship offers from Montana State University, Idaho State University and the University of Maryland, Baltimore County, Nield will join BYU as a walk-on. Later in the summer, on July 31, it was reported that Alex Barcello, a consensus 4-star recruit, would transfer from the University of Arizona. He was granted a waiver and was eligible to play immediately.

Returned Missionaries 
Two players were added to the roster during the offseason who recently returned from missionary service. Trevin Knell originally had committed to University of California, Berkeley. However, due to a coaching change at Cal, he decided to play for BYU in May 2017 before leaving on his mission in July. Knell is a consensus 3-star prospect who was part of the 2017 recruiting class. Cameron Pearson joins the team as a walk-on after serving a mission in Chile and utilizing a redshirt year. Pearson was part of the 2016 recruiting class after playing at Chatfield High School in Lakewood, Colorado.

2019 Recruiting Class

2020 Recruiting Class 
Six high school players committed to play for BYU from the 2020 recruiting class. Richie Saunders, Dallin Hall, Tanner Hayhurst and Tanner Toolson each plan to complete two-year full-time missionary service before joining the team for the 2022–23 season. Only Townsend Tripple and Caleb Lohner will join the roster for the 2020–21 season. Tripple had originally planned to complete missionary service before joining the team and was assigned to Argentina, but decided to delay his mission trip due to coronavirus and joined the roster as a walk-on. In early June, it was reported that Caleb Lohner, a four-star forward from Texas who had previously signed with Utah, requested a release from his National Letter of Intent to sign with BYU. Lohner was released, and on June 26 officially signed with the Cougars. Lohner will be a true freshman and is immediately eligible to play.

Preseason Polls and Rankings 
BYU was selected to finish third in the West Coast Conference in the Preseason Men's Basketball Coaches Poll behind Gonzaga and Saint Mary's. Yoeli Childs and TJ Haws were named to the 2019-2020 All-WCC Pre-season Men's Basketball Team. For the second straight year, Yoeli Childs was among 20 college basketball forwards named to the Karl Malone watch list. The Karl Malone Award selects the nation's top power forward in NCAA college basketball. In early November, before the season began, Yoeli was also named to the list of 50 players to watch for the 2020 Citizen Naismith Trophy Men's Player of the Year as well as the Preseason Top 50 Watch List for The John R. Wooden Award.

Several media outlets ranked BYU among the top 100 Division I college basketball preseason teams for the 2019-20 season. The rankings ranged from as high as #41 from Team Rankings and ESPN's BPI ranking to as low as #75 by Sports Illustrated. Some rankings projected BYU as a possible NCAA Tournament team or as a possible NIT Tournament selection. Consistent with the WCC preseason coaches poll, each of the writers projected BYU 3rd among WCC teams. A summary of the various preseason rankings that included BYU is as follows:

Preseason Injuries and Suspensions 
Several players were injured or were subject to suspensions during the offseason that will affect their ability to play during the regular season. Yoeli Childs was suspended by the NCAA for paperwork errors in the NBA draft exploration process that will cause him to miss the first nine games of the regular season. In August, Zac Seljaas broke his foot during a game in Italy and was estimated to be out until November or December 2019. His recovery progressed rapidly and he was cleared to play by the opening game of the season. Gavin Baxter injured his shoulder in a practice during September which will likely result in his missing the entire 2019-20 season. It was revealed in November that Jesse Wade has for some time had a knee injury which is likely to prevent him from playing for a long term period.

Italy Trip and Scrimmages 
During August, BYU played four games as part of a trip to Italy. BYU won all four games during the 10-day tour of Italy. Every four years, the NCAA permits college basketball teams to take a trip to a foreign country. 

On October 26, just before the regular season began, the team also played a scrimmage against the University of California, Berkeley. While the results and statistics of the scrimmage were not released to the public, Mark Pope indicated that the team played quite well.

Roster

Source: BYU Basketball 2019-20 Roster (https://byucougars.com/roster/m-basketball/)

Media Coverage

Radio 
Greg Wrubell and Mark Durrant return to call men's basketball for the 2019–20 season. Jason Shepherd will fill-in for Greg at Houston and vs. Montana Tech (football/women's soccer conflicts), and Terry Nashif will fill-in for Mark Durrant on select road games.

Affiliates:

BYU Radio- Flagship Station Nationwide (Dish Network 980, Sirius XM 143, KBYU 89.1 FM HD 2, TuneIn radio, and byuradio.org)
KSL 102.7 FM and 1160 AM- (Salt Lake City / Provo, Utah and ksl.com)
KSNA 100.7 FM - Blackfoot / Idaho Falls / Pocatello / Rexburg, Idaho (games)
KSPZ 105.1 FM and 980 AM- Blackfoot / Idaho Falls / Pocatello / Rexburg, Idaho (coaches' shows)
KMXD 100.5 FM- Monroe / Manti, Utah
KSVC 980 AM- Richfield / Manti, Utah
KDXU 94.9 FM and 890 AM- St. George, Utah

Television 
In September 2019, the West Coast Conference (WCC) agreed to a multi-year deal through the 2026-27 season with ESPN and the CBS Sports Network to broadcast numerous basketball games each year. Previously, the WCC had an agreement with ESPN, but the new agreement adds additional television coverage of basketball games through the CBS Sports Network. Games broadcast on the CBS Sports Network are carried on channel 158 on the Dish Network, channel 221 on DirecTV and channel 269 on Xfinity. Under the terms of the deal, ESPN will broadcast 17 games during the regular season and the CBS Sports Network will broadcast a minimum of 9 games. ESPN will continue to broadcast the quarterfinals, semifinals and the championship game of the WCC tournament. BYU maintains the rights to broadcast home games on BYUtv (11.1 in Salt Lake City, Utah, channel 374 on the Dish Network, and channel 4369/9403 on DirecTV). Meanwhile Stadium broadcasts will be simulcast on KJZZ or KMYU because Utah doesn't have a Stadium tv affiliate.

Schedule and results

|-
!colspan=11 style=| Exhibition

|-
!colspan=11 style=| Non-conference regular season

|-
!colspan=11 style=| WCC regular season

|-
!colspan=11 style=| WCC tournament

Game summaries
Series Histories are adjusted this season to show the 47 wins the NCAA had BYU forfeit during the 2015–16 and 2016–17 seasons after BYU lost their appeal. The forfeits aren't added to the loss column. They are merely struck from the win column.

Exhibition: UT Tyler
Broadcasters: Dave McCann & Blaine Fowler 
Starting Lineups:
UT Tyler: Ty Glover, Ty Bennett, Jerekius Davis, Chris Giles, Quinn Smith
BYU: Alex Barcello, Jake Toolson, Dalton Nixon, Kolby Lee, Connor Harding

Cal State Fullerton 
Series History: Series even 3–3

Broadcasters: Dave McCann, Blaine Fowler & Spencer Linton
Starting Lineups:

Cal State Fullerton: Daniel Venzant, Austen Awosika, Wayne Arnold, Davon Clare, Johnny Wang
BYU: Alex Barcello, Jake Toolson, TJ Haws, Dalton Nixon, Kolby Lee

San Diego State 
Series History: BYU leads series 48–25

Broadcasters: Dave McCann, Blaine Fowler, & Spencer Linton 
Starting Lineups:
San Diego State: Yanni Wetzell, Nathan Mensah, KJ Feagin, Jordan Schakel, Malachi Flynn
BYU: Alex Barcello, Jake Toolson, TJ Haws, Dalton Nixon, Kolby Lee

Southern Utah
Series History: BYU leads series 11–0

Broadcasters: Dave McCann, Blaine Fowler & Spencer Linton
Starting Lineups:

Southern Utah: Jakolby Long, Dre Marin, Cameron Oluyitan, Dwayne Morgan, Andre Adams
BYU: Alex Barcello, Jake Toolson, TJ Haws, Dalton Nixon, Kolby Lee

Houston
Series History: Houston leads series 5–2

Broadcasters: Ted Emrich & Tim Welsh
Starting Lineups:
BYU: Alex Barcello, Jake Toolson, TJ Haws, Dalton Nixon, Kolby Lee
Houston: Chris Harris Jr., DeJon Jarreau, Nate Hinton, Quentin Grimes, Fabian White Jr.

Boise State
Series History: BYU leads series 9–4

Broadcasters: Rich Waltz & Dan Dickau
Starting Lineups:

BYU: Alex Barcello, Jake Toolson, TJ Haws, Dalton Nixon, Kolby Lee
Boise State: RJ Williams, Marcus Dickinson, Justinian Jessup, Derrick Alston, Alex Hobbs

UCLA
Series History: UCLA leads series 12–11

Broadcasters: Dave Pasch & Bill Walton
Starting Lineups:
BYU: Alex Barcello, Jake Toolson, TJ Haws, Dalton Nixon, Kolby Lee
UCLA: Cody Riley, Chris Smith, Tyger Campbell, Prince Ali, Jalen Hill

Kansas
Series History: Kansas leads series 3–1

Broadcasters: Dan Shulman & Jay Bilas (ESPN)Marc Kestecher & Malcolm Huckaby (ESPN Radio)
Starting Lineups:

Kansas: Marcus Garrett, Devon Dotson, Ochai Agbaji, David McCormack, Udoka Azubuike
BYU: Alex Barcello, Jake Toolson, TJ Haws, Dalton Nixon, Kolby Lee

Virginia Tech
Series History: BYU leads series 3–0

Broadcasters: Dave Pasch & Bill Walton
Starting Lineups:
Virginia Tech: Landers Nolley II, Wabissa Bede, Nahiem Alleyne, P.J. Horne, Tyrece Radford
BYU: Alex Barcello, Jake Toolson, TJ Haws, Dalton Nixon, Kolby Lee

Montana Tech
Series History: First Meeting

Broadcasters: Dave McCann & Blaine Fowler 
Starting Lineups:
Montana Tech: Sindou Diallo, Troy Owens Jr., Dylan Pannabecker, Taylor England, Drew Huse
BYU: Alex Barcello, Jake Toolson, TJ Haws, Dalton Nixon, Kolby Lee

Utah
First game Yoeli Childs is eligible to play after being suspended for the first 9 games for NBA Draft paperwork and agent errors.
Series History: BYU leads series 131–128 
Broadcasters: Ted Robinson & Matt Muehlebach
Starting Lineups:
BYU: Alex Barcello, Jake Toolson, Yoeli Childs, TJ Haws, Kolby Lee
Utah: Timmy Allen, Both Gach, Rylan Jones, Riley Battin, Branden Carlson

UNLV
Series History: UNLV leads series 19–16

Broadcasters: Dave McCann, Blaine Fowler, & Spencer Linton 
Starting Lineups:

UNLV: Cheikh Mbacke Diong, Bryce Hamilton, Amauri Hardy, Vitaliy Shibel, Donnie Tillman
BYU: Alex Barcello, Jake Toolson, Yoeli Childs, TJ Haws, Kolby Lee

Nevada
Series History: BYU leads series 13–7

Broadcasters: Eric Rothman & Sean Farnham 
Starting Lineups:
Nevada: Robby Robinson, Jalen Harris, Johncarlos Reyes, Lindsey Drew, Jazz Johnson
BYU: Alex Barcello, Jake Toolson, Yoeli Childs, TJ Haws, Kolby Lee

Utah State
Series History: BYU leads series 141–92

Broadcasters: Dave McCann, Blaine Fowler, & Spencer Linton 
Starting Lineups:

Utah State: Sam Merrill, Alphonso Anderson, Abel Porter, Brock Miller, Justin Bean
BYU: Alex Barcello, Jake Toolson, Yoeli Childs, TJ Haws, Kolby Lee

Weber State
Series History: BYU leads series 32–11

Broadcasters: Dave McCann & Blaine Fowler
Starting Lineups:
Weber State: KJ Cunningham, Kham Davis, Cody John, Jerrick Harding, Michal Kozak
BYU: Alex Barcello, Jake Toolson, Yoeli Childs, TJ Haws, Dalton Nixon

Oral Roberts
Series History: BYU leads series 6–0

Broadcasters: Dave McCann, Blaine Fowler, & Spencer Linton 
Starting Lineups:

Oral Roberts: Kevin Obanor, Deondre Burns, Max Abmas, Sam Kearns, Emmanuel Nzekwesi
BYU: Alex Barcello, Jake Toolson, Yoeli Childs, TJ Haws, Dalton Nixon

Loyola Marymount 
Series History: BYU leads series 11–5

Broadcasters: Dave McCann, Blaine Fowler, & Spencer Linton
Starting Lineups:

Loyola Marymount: Eli Scott, Deovaunta Williams, Jordan Bell, Ivan Alipiev, Erik Johansson
BYU: Alex Barcello, Jake Toolson, Yoeli Childs, TJ Haws, Dalton Nixon

Saint Mary's 
Series History: Saint Mary's leads series 14–13

Broadcasters: Roxy Bernstein & Corey Williams
Starting Lineups:

BYU: Alex Barcello, Jake Toolson, Kolby Lee, TJ Haws, Dalton Nixon
Saint Mary's: Malik Fitts, Dan Fotu, Tanner Krebs, Jordan Ford, Tommy Kuhse

Portland 
Series History: BYU leads series 17–2

Broadcasters: Dave McCann, Blaine Fowler, & Jarom Jordan
Starting Lineups:

Portland: Tahirou Diabate, Jacob Tryon, Malcolm Porter, Isaiah White, Chase Adams
BYU: Alex Barcello, Jake Toolson, Yoeli Childs, TJ Haws, Dalton Nixon

San Diego 
Series History: BYU leads series 13–6

Broadcasters: Dave McCann, Blaine Fowler, & Spencer Linton
Starting Lineups:

San Diego: Alex Floresca, James Jean-Marie, Braun Hartfield, Joey Calcaterra, Finn Sullivan
BYU: Alex Barcello, Jake Toolson, TJ Haws, Dalton Nixon, Kolby Lee

Gonzaga 
Series History: Gonzaga leads series 17–4

Broadcasters: Dave Flemming & Adrian Branch
Starting Lineups:

BYU: Alex Barcello, Jake Toolson, TJ Haws, Dalton Nixon, Kolby Lee
Gonzaga: Filip Petrusev, Corey Kispert, Killian Tillie, Ryan Woolridge, Joel Ayayi

Pacific 
Series History: BYU leads series 9–6

Broadcasters: Ari Wolfe & Dave Miller
Starting Lineups:

BYU: Alex Barcello, Jake Toolson, Yoeli Childs, TJ Haws, Kolby Lee
Pacific: Amari McCray, Jahlil Tripp, Pierre Cockrell II, Daniss Jenkins, Broc Finstuen

San Francisco 
Series History: BYU leads series 15–8

Broadcasters: Noah Coslov & Dani Klupenger
Starting Lineups:

BYU: Alex Barcello, Jake Toolson, Yoeli Childs, TJ Haws, Kolby Lee
San Francisco: Jamaree Bouyea, Josh Kunen, Charles Minlend, Jimbo Lull, Jordan Ratinho

Pepperdine 
Series History: BYU leads series 12–9

Broadcasters: Jason Horowitz & Ryan Hollins
Starting Lineups:

Pepperdine: Sedrick Altman, Colbey Ross, Kessler Edwards, Kameron Edwards, Skylar Chavez
BYU: Alex Barcello, Jake Toolson, Yoeli Childs, TJ Haws, Kolby Lee

Saint Mary's 
Series History: Series tied 14–14

Broadcasters: Dave Flemming & Dan Dickau
Starting Lineups:

Saint Mary's: Jordan Ford, Tommy Kuhse, Malik Fitts, Dan Fotu, Alex Ducas 
BYU: Alex Barcello, Jake Toolson, Yoeli Childs, TJ Haws, Kolby Lee

Portland 
Series History: BYU leads series 18–2

Broadcasters: Barry Tompkins &  Dani Klupenger
Starting Lineups:
BYU: Alex Barcello, Jake Toolson, Yoeli Childs, TJ Haws, Kolby Lee
Portland: JoJo Walker, Isaiah White, Chase Adams, Tahirou Diabate, Jacob Tryon

San Francisco 
Series History: BYU leads series 15–9

Broadcasters: Dave McCann, Blaine Fowler, & Spencer Linton
Starting Lineups:
San Francisco: Jamaree Bouyea, Jimbo Lull, Josh Kunen, Charles Minlend, Jordan Ratinho
BYU: Alex Barcello, Jake Toolson, Yoeli Childs, TJ Haws, Kolby Lee

Loyola Marymount 
Series History: BYU leads series 12–5

Broadcasters: Eric Rothman & Dan Dickau
Starting Lineups:
BYU: Alex Barcello, Jake Toolson, Yoeli Childs, TJ Haws, Kolby Lee
Loyola Marymount: Eli Scott, Parker Dortch, Erik Johansson, Lazar Zivanovich, Keli Leaupepe

San Diego 
Series History: BYU leads series 14–6

Broadcasters: John Schriffen & Ryan Hollins
Starting Lineups:
BYU: Alex Barcello, Jake Toolson, Yoeli Childs, TJ Haws, Kolby Lee
San Diego: Alex Floresca, James Jean-Marie, Braun Hartfield, Joey Calcaterra, Marion Humphery

Santa Clara 
Series History: BYU leads series 27–6

Broadcasters: Michael Grady & Ryan Hollins
Starting Lineups:
Santa Clara: Trey Wertz, Jaden Bediako, Josip Vrankic, Keshawn Justice, Jalen Williams
BYU: Alex Barcello, Jake Toolson, Yoeli Childs, TJ Haws, Kolby Lee

Gonzaga 
Series History: Gonzaga leads series 17–5

Broadcasters: Dave Flemming & Sean Farnham
Starting Lineups:
Gonzaga: Filip Petrusev, Ryan Woolridge, Joel Ayayi, Corey Kispert, Killian Tillie  
BYU: Alex Barcello, Jake Toolson, Yoeli Childs, TJ Haws, Kolby Lee

Pepperdine 
Series History: BYU leads series 13–9

Broadcasters: Rich Waltz & Dan Dickau
Starting Lineups:
BYU: Alex Barcello, Jake Toolson, Yoeli Childs, TJ Haws, Kolby Lee
Pepperdine: Sedrick Altman, Colbey Ross, Kessler Edwards, Kameron Edwards, Skylar Chavez

WCC Semifinal: Saint Mary's 
Series History: Saint Mary's leads series 15–14

Broadcasters: Bob Wischusen & Sean Farnham
Starting Lineups:

Saint Mary's: Tanner Krebs, Jordan Ford, Tommy Kuhse, Malik Fitts, Dan Fotu
BYU: Alex Barcello, Jake Toolson, Yoeli Childs, Gavin Baxter, TJ Haws

Rankings

References 

 

2019-20 team
BYU
2019 in sports in Utah
2020 in sports in Utah